Robert Henry Lawrence Jr. (October 2, 1935 – December 8, 1967) was a United States Air Force officer and the first African-American astronaut.

Early years
Born and raised in Chicago, Illinois, Lawrence attended Haines Elementary School and, at age sixteen, graduated in the top 10 percent from Englewood High School in 1952. Four years later in 1956, he graduated from Bradley University with a Bachelor of Science degree in Chemistry. At Bradley, Lawrence became a member of Omega Psi Phi fraternity and distinguished himself as Cadet Commander in the Air Force ROTC and received the commission of second lieutenant in the Air Force Reserve Program.

Air Force

At the age of 21, he was designated as a U.S. Air Force pilot after completing flight training at Malden Air Force Base, Missouri.

At 22, he married Barbara Cress, daughter of Dr. and Mrs. Henry Cress of Chicago.  By the time he was 25, he had completed an Air Force assignment as an instructor pilot in the T-33 training aircraft for the German Air Force.

In 1965, Lawrence earned a PhD in physical chemistry from Ohio State University. His doctoral thesis was The Mechanism Of The Tritium Beta Ray Induced Exchange Reaction Of Deuterium With Methane and Ethane In The Gas Phase.

He was a senior USAF pilot, accumulating well over 2,500 flight hours, 2,000 of which were in jets. Lawrence flew many tests in the Lockheed F-104 Starfighter to investigate the gliding flight of various unpowered spacecraft returning to Earth from orbit, such as the North American X-15 rocket-plane. NASA cited Lawrence for accomplishments and flight maneuver data that "contributed greatly to the development of the Space Shuttle."

Astronaut

In June 1967, Lawrence successfully completed the U.S. Air Force Test Pilot School (Class 66B) at Edwards AFB, California. The same month, he was selected by the USAF as an astronaut in the Air Force's Manned Orbital Laboratory (MOL) program, thus becoming the country's first black astronaut.

Lawrence and other MOL astronauts laughed when asked at the announcement "Will you have to sit in the back seat of the capsule?" When asked if his selection was historic for race relations in the United States, Lawrence answered "No, I don't think so. It's another one of those things that we look forward to in civil rights — normal progression." He said that he had faced problems like other blacks, but "Perhaps I have been more fortunate than the others in the opportunities." Donald H. Peterson, chosen for MOL with Lawrence, said "I can't speak for all the people in Mississippi" but that he was not reluctant to work with a black man.

Death and legacy
At age 32, Lawrence was killed in a plane crash at Edwards AFB on December 8, 1967. He was flying backseat in an F-104 as the instructor pilot for flight test trainee Major Harvey Royer, who was learning the steep-descent glide technique. Royer made such an approach but flared too late.

The airplane struck the ground hard, its main gear failed, it caught fire, and rolled. Major Royer ejected upward and survived, with major injuries. The back seat, which delays a moment to avoid hitting the front seat, ejected sideways, killing Lawrence instantly. He was still strapped to his ejector seat; his parachute failed to open and was dragged  from the wreck.

Had Lawrence lived, he likely would have been among the MOL astronauts who became NASA Astronaut Group 7 after MOL's cancellation, all of whom flew on the Space Shuttle.

During his brief career, Lawrence earned the Air Force Commendation Medal, the Outstanding Unit Citation. On December 8, 1997, his name was inscribed on the Space Mirror Memorial at the Kennedy Space Center in Florida.

The 13th Northrop Grumman Cygnus spacecraft, which launched on February 15, 2020, was named the S.S. Robert H. Lawrence in his honor.

The artist Tavares Strachan dedicated his satellite sculpture ENOCH, launched in 2018, to Lawrence.

In 2020, NASA included Lawrence in a group of 27 pioneering African-American, Hispanic, and Native American astronauts to commemorate by naming asteroids after them. The asteroid, Robertlawrence 92892, is located in the main asteroid belt between Mars and Jupiter.

See also

List of African-American astronauts

References

External links

 Biography of Robert Henry Lawrence Jr. from Spacefacts.de
 First Black Astronaut Honored on 50th Anniversary of Death

1935 births
1967 deaths
Accidental deaths in California
African-American United States Air Force personnel
American astronauts
American physical chemists
American test pilots
Aviators killed in aviation accidents or incidents in the United States
Bradley University alumni
Ohio State University alumni
Military personnel from Chicago
Space program fatalities
United States Air Force officers
U.S. Air Force Test Pilot School alumni
Victims of aviation accidents or incidents in 1967
Englewood Technical Prep Academy alumni
20th-century African-American people